Kavita Paudwal Tulpule (born 1974), is an Indian singer. She is known for singing devotional songs Bhajan and has released around 40 music albums, including Gayatri Mantra, Krishna and Lakshmi and Amrutvani. She has been singing devotional songs since 1995. She has lent her voices for hit songs like Haiyya (1995), Mirch Masala (1996), and Julie I love you. She has done playback singing for many Bollywood films, some of few include Tohfa (1984), Junoon (1992), Phool Bane Patthar (1998), Bhavna (1984), and Angaaray (1998).

She sings predominantly in Hindi lanugauge films and music albums but has also sung in Tamil, Telugu, Bengali, Kannada, Marathi, Gujarati, Nepali, Malayalam, Oriya, Bhojpuri and other Indian languages.

Early life and education 
Paudwal holds a commerce degree from Narsee Monjee College of Commerce and Economics, Mumbai. She completed her master's degree in interactive media from Tisch School of Arts, New York University. She was trained in Hindustani classical music by Pandit Jialal Vasant and Suresh Wadkar and her parents Arun Paudwal and Anuradha Paudwal.

Career 
At the age of 13, she debuted as a playback singer from Mahesh Bhatt's film Junoon. By the time Kavita was 16, she had composed music for two films. Kavita has given her voice to various film composers like A. R. Rahman, Lakshmikant-Pyarelal, Anu Malik, Bappi Lahiri. She has done playback singing for actresses like Kajol, Aishwarya Rai Bachchan, Sonali Bendre, Pooja Bhatt. She has launched 40 devotional music CDs with T-Series. She has sung with co-singers like Hariharan, Sonu Nigam, Javed Ali and Shaan.

Paudwal has done playback singing for the film such as Tohfa (1984), Bhavna (1984), Amchyasarkhe Aamich (1990), Jamla Ho Jamla (1995), Phool Bane Patthar (1998), Ratchagan (1997), Minsara Kanavu (1997), Krantikari (1997), Angaaray (1998), Love You Hamesha (2001) and Heroine No 1(2001).

In November 2019, she collaborated with Pankaj Udhas for a Marathi Bhavgeet single, titled Ranga Dhanoocha Zhula.

Discography 
 As playback singer

Albums

Personal life 
She is the daughter of Anuradha Paudwal and Arun Paudwal.

References

External links 
 
 Kavita Paudwal plans a comeback

1974 births
Living people
Bhajan singers
Singers from Mumbai
People from Mumbai
21st-century Indian singers
21st-century Indian women singers
Bengali-language singers
Kannada playback singers
Marathi playback singers
Marathi-language singers
Odia playback singers
Nepali-language singers from India
Tamil-language singers
Indian women classical singers
Indian women singers